Midway is a town located in eastern Bullock County, Alabama, United States. At the 2020 census, the population was 421.

Old Merritt School

Margaret Elizabeth Merritt of Midway sold two acres for $5 to the State of Alabama in 1921 as a site for an elementary school for African-American children. Built in 1922 with matching Rosenwald funds, the Midway Colored Public School featured oak and pine construction and two classrooms divided by a partition. The building is one of the few surviving of the more than 5,000 rural black schools built with contributions for the Julius Rosenwald Fund. The building was enlarged twice then renovated in 1978. It is now used as a community center. It was added to the Alabama Register of Landmarks and Heritage on November 2, 1990 and the National Register of Historic Places on February 20, 1998.

The school is located in Bullock County. Bullock has the highest illiteracy rate of any county in Alabama.

Geography
Midway is located in eastern Bullock County at 32°4'27.854" North, 85°31'12.857" West (32.074404, −85.520238).

Alabama State Route 51 leads south  to Clayton.

Demographics

As of the census of 2000, there were 457 people, 189 households, and 124 families residing in the town. The racial makeup of the town was 88.84% Black or African American and 11.16% White. 0.22% of the population were Hispanic or Latino of any race.

There were 189 households, out of which 34.4% had children under the age of 18 living with them, 26.5% were married couples living together, 37.0% had a female householder with no husband present, and 33.9% were non-families. 31.7% of all households were made up of individuals, and 12.7% had someone living alone who was 65 years of age or older. The average household size was 2.42 and the average family size was 3.06.

In the town, the age distribution of the population shows 29.8% under the age of 18, 9.6% from 18 to 24, 23.4% from 25 to 44, 21.9% from 45 to 64, and 15.3% who were 65 years of age or older. The median age was 35 years. For every 100 females, there were 71.2 males. For every 100 females age 18 and over, there were 63.8 males.

The median income for a household in the town was $12,143, and the median income for a family was $19,063. Males had a median income of $25,938 versus $18,750 for females. The per capita income for the town was $9,036. About 38.1% of families and 42.5% of the population were below the poverty line, including 52.4% of those under age 18 and 45.0% of those age 65 or over.

Notable people
 Johnny Ford, mayor of Tuskegee, Alabama
 Jerrel Jernigan, wide receiver for the New York Giants
 The Reverend Jesse Lee Peterson, media personality, minister and author
 Harold Pierce, founded the Harold's Chicken Shack restaurant chain in Chicago
 Bobby Turner, Denver Broncos running back coach

In popular culture
 Rufus Amos Adams is said to be from Midway in the Paul and Storm song of the same name.

See also

 List of towns in Alabama

References

External links

Towns in Alabama
Towns in Bullock County, Alabama